The Willie Way is the 15th studio album by country singer Willie Nelson. This was also the last album of new material released by RCA Records before Nelson's departure for Atlantic Records and move to Austin, Texas.

Background
The Willie Way capped off Nelson's underwhelming seven-year tenure at RCA Records.  He never attained the same success as a recording artist that he had as a songwriter, and became more frustrated with not being allowed to use his own band on his recording sessions.  Producer Chet Atkins adhered to the Nashville Sound with Nelson, smothering his songs with violins and syrupy background vocalists in an attempt to break him as a national star, but the efforts proved fruitless.  By the early seventies the apathy seemed to cut both ways, with author Michael Streissguth noting that The Willie Way “arrived in stores packaged in the most unimaginative album sleeve ever to come out of Nashville.” The album includes his first cover of Kris Kristofferson’s “Help Me Make It Through the Night,” which Nelson would recut for Sings Kristofferson in 1979.  "You Left Me a Long, Long Time Ago” would be included as a bonus track on the 20th Anniversary edition of Wanted! The Outlaws

Reception
At the time of the album's release Rolling Stone’s Chet Flippo wrote that Nelson “sang with a freshness drawn from his own blues-tinged country style.” Jim Worbois of AllMusic states,  “’You Left Me a Long, Long Time Ago’ is worth the price of this record alone. Also, Willie's version of ‘Undo the Right’ is easily as good as Johnny Bush's 1968 hit."

Track listing
All tracks composed by Willie Nelson, except where indicated.

"You Left Me a Long, Long Time Ago" 2:41
"Wonderful Future" 2:39
"Help Me Make It Through the Night" (Kris Kristofferson) 3:00
"Wake Me When It's Over" 3:46
"Undo the Right" (Nelson, Hank Cochran) 2:21
"Mountain Dew" (Bascom Lamar Lunsford, Scotty Wiseman) 2:09
"Home Is Where You're Happy" 3:03
"A Moment Isn't Very Long" 3:07
"What Do You Want Me to Do?" 2:31
"I'd Rather You Didn't Love Me" 2:40

Personnel
Willie Nelson - guitar, vocals
Al Pachucki, Les Ladd - recording engineers
Roy Shockley, Mike Shockley - recording technicians
Jimmy Moore - cover photography

References

1972 albums
Willie Nelson albums
Albums produced by Felton Jarvis
RCA Records albums